The Marysville Meteors were a professional basketball team located in Marysville, Ohio, United States.

2006 season
The Meteors played with the Columbus Cyclones nickname during the 2006 season, all home games were played at Westerville North High School. The team finished 20-3, and played in the IBL Championship Game, where they lost to the Elkhart Express 119-108 in overtime. The team was led in scoring by Michael Brownlee(21.7 ppg), and also featured Paul Haynes(18.8 ppg). Both were all-stars. The team averaged roughly 1,000 fans per game that first season.

2007 season
According to a press release, the Cyclones would be moving to Marysville, Ohio for their 2007 season. Coached by former OSU Buckeye Shaun Smith, the Meteors continued to dominate the league. Esteban Weaver lead the Meteors in scoring, with 33.2 ppg in 13 games, not enough to appear on the IBL leader board. Micheal Brownlee also contributed, with 25.2 ppg, good for tenth in the IBL.

Roster & coaching staff
Roster for the 2007 season

Season by season

All-Stars

2006
As Columbus Cyclones
 Michael Brownlee
 Paul Haynes

2007
 Mike Brownlee 
 Larry Drake
 Aaron Turner

References

External links
Team page on IBL website
Official Website
Website with game photos

International Basketball League teams
Basketball teams in Ohio